Yamaha RX-Z 135 was a two-stroke naked bike manufactured by Yamaha Motor Corporation. Debuting in April 1985, the RX-Z was very popular in Malaysia and Singapore and was sold for more than two decades before the production was ended in 2011.

In 2004, the model was revised cosmetically and a catalytic converter was installed.

Overview 

The Yamaha RX-Z was originally equipped with a five-speed transmission with solid front disc brake. The model shared the same platform and chassis as its predecessor, the water-cooled Yamaha RD125. Shortly after the launch, the RX-Z became popular among young motorcyclists especially in Malaysia. A few years later, the engine was upgraded with the installation of a six-speed transmission, together with newer instrument panel and handlebar switches, as well as a cross-drilled front disc brake rotor.

The design of the RX-Z remained unchanged until 2004 when the model was updated, with the rear lights borrowed from the Yamaha Y125Z. The new RX-Z was equipped with a catalytic converter, sacrificing 1 PS of maximum power (original maximum power: 21 PS). However, the maximum torque remained unchanged but the low-end torque was improved compared with the early models. Some owners of the earlier RX-Z motorcycles may have problems during take-off because the engine tends to stall when an inexperienced rider tries to take off in the first gear. However, the problem was resolved in the new model.

In Malaysia, the RX-Z was one of the motorcycle models often associated with Mat Rempit street racers.  As a result, many Malay movies including Remp-It use the RX-Z in their movies.

The production of the RX-Z ended in 2011.

References

RX-Z
Standard motorcycles
Two-stroke motorcycles
Motorcycles introduced in 1987